Bozüyük District is a district of Bilecik Province of Turkey. Its seat is the city Bozüyük. Its area is 860 km2, and its population is 78,010 (2021). The district borders İnegöl to the west, Pazaryeri to the northwest, Bilecik to the north, Söğüt to the northeast, Tepebaşı (Eskişehir) to the east, İnönü to the southeast, Kütahya and Tavşanlı to the south and Domaniç to the southwest.

Composition
There are two municipalities in Bozüyük District:
 Bozüyük
 Dodurga

There are 44 villages in Bozüyük District:

 Akçapınar
 Aksutekke
 Alibeydüzü
 Aşağıarmutlu
 Bozalan
 Camiliyayla
 Çamyayla
 Çaydere
 Cihangazi
 Çokçapınar
 Darıdere
 Delielmacık
 Dombayçayırı
 Dübekli
 Düzağaç
 Düzdağ
 Eceköy
 Erikli
 Gökçeli
 Göynücek
 Günyarık
 Hamidiye
 Kandilli
 Kapanalan
 Karaağaç
 Karabayır
 Karaçayır
 Ketenlik
 Kızılcapınar
 Kızıltepe
 Kovalıca
 Kozpınar
 Kuyupınar
 Metristepe
 Muratdere
 Ormangüzle
 Osmaniye
 Poyra
 Revnak
 Saraycık
 Yeniçepni
 Yenidodurga
 Yeniüreğil
 Yeşilçukurca

References

Districts of Bilecik Province